Coxa valga is a deformity of the hip where the angle formed between the head and neck of the femur and its shaft is increased, usually above 135 degrees.

The differential diagnosis includes neuromuscular disorders (i.e. cerebral palsy, spinal dysraphism, poliomyelitis), skeletal dysplasias, and juvenile idiopathic arthritis.

Coxa valga deformity is a common pathologic condition in children with cerebral palsy and they may be predisposed to hip subluxation or dislocations.

See also
Coxa vara
Genu valgum
Genu varum

References

External links 

Arthropathies
Congenital disorders of musculoskeletal system